"Make You Mine" is a song recorded by British Singer Talay Riley. The song was released as a single on 28 August 2011 as a digital download in the United Kingdom from his cancelled debut album Talay Riley. It was later released on his mixtape, Going to California. The remix was produced by Quiz & Larossi and mixed by Manny Marroquin.

Music video
A music video to accompany the release of "Make You Mine" was first released onto YouTube on 4 July 2011 at a total length of three minutes and twenty seconds.

Track listing

Chart performance
On 4 September 2011 the song entered the UK Singles Chart at number 57 and number 17 on the UK R&B Chart. This marks Rileys first song to chart as a solo artist.

Charts

Release history

References

2011 singles
Talay Riley songs
2011 songs
Jive Records singles